Anzalone may refer to:

 Alex Anzalone (born 1994), American football linebacker 
 Edwin M. Anzalone, better known as Fireman Ed (born 1959), American superfan of the New York Jets
 Eric Anzalone (born 1965), American singer
 Fabrizio Anzalone (born 1978), Italian footballer
 Frank Anzalone (born 1954), American ice hockey coach

Italian-language surnames